LCAT or L-CAT may refer to:
 Engin de débarquement amphibie rapide, a catamaran landing craft
 Lecithin–cholesterol acyltransferase, an animalian enzyme involved in cholesterol metabolism 
 Lyon County Area Transportation, a municipal bus company in Emporia, Kansas, United States
 LUMS Common Admission Test, for Lahore University of Management Sciences